The IMOCA 60 Class yacht Fleury-Michon X was designed by Philippe Briand and launched in February 1989 after being built by Jeanneau based in Les Herbiers, France.

Racing results

References 

1980s sailing yachts
Sailboat type designs by Philippe Briand
Sailboat types built by Jeanneau
Vendée Globe boats
IMOCA 60